Faisel Majrashi (Arabic:فيصل مجرشي; born 10 October 1984) is a Saudi Arabian football (soccer) player who currently plays for Ras Tanura as a winger.

References

External links
 Saudi Pro League Statistics - Faisel Majrashi player page

Saudi Arabian footballers
1984 births
Living people
Al-Nahda Club (Saudi Arabia) players
Al-Qaisumah FC players
Al-Nojoom FC players
Al-Sahel SC (Saudi Arabia) players
Al-Salam SC (Saudi Arabia) players
Al-Entesar Club players
Al-Noor FC players
Ras Tanura SC players
Saudi First Division League players
Saudi Professional League players
Saudi Second Division players
Saudi Fourth Division players
Saudi Third Division players
Association football wingers